Greggory is both a surname and a given name. Notable people with the name include:

Pascal Greggory (born 1954), French actor
Greggory Nations, American television writer and script coordinator

See also
Gregory (disambiguation)